Llyn Melynllyn (Welsh  for yellow lake) is a lake within the Carneddau range of mountains in Snowdonia, North Wales.

Cliffs rise steeply from its western edge, up to the summit of Foel Grach, and down from which most of its feeder streams flow.

A small dam was built at its northern end in 1887, but this was deliberately breached in 1970.  The lake acts as a reservoir for the Llandudno area.

Less than a kilometre to its north lies the larger Llyn Dulyn.

The outflow from the lake is called Afon Melynllyn, this stream flowing north-east to join Afon Dulyn, itself a tributary of the river Conwy.

References 
The Lakes of Eryri by Geraint Roberts, Gwasg Carreg Gwalch, 1985

Caerhun
Melynllyn
Melynllyn